Miike may refer to:

The Miike coal mine, Japan
Takashi Miike, Japanese filmmaker
Miike Domain
Miike District, Fukuoka
Lake Miike

See also
Miike Snow, Swedish electronic band

Japanese-language surnames